In computer science, Iacono's working set structure  is a comparison based dictionary. It supports insertion, deletion and access operation to maintain a dynamic set of  elements. 
The working set of an item  is the set of elements that have been accessed in the structure since the last time that  was accessed (or inserted if it was never accessed).
Inserting and deleting in the working set structure takes  time while accessing an element  takes .

Structure

To store a dynamic set of  elements, this structure consists of a series of Red–black trees, or other Self-balancing binary search trees , and a series of deques (Double-ended queues) , where . For every , tree  and deque  share the same contents and pointers are maintained between their corresponding elements.
Every element that has been inserted in the data structure is stored in exactly one of the trees and its corresponding deque.

Working set Invariant
In the deques of this structure, elements are kept in sorted order according to their working set size.
Formally, element  lies after  in deque  if and only if . Moreover, for every , the elements in deque  have a smaller working sets than the elements in deque . This property is referred to as the Working set invariant. Every operation in the data structure maintains the Working set invariant.

Operations
Regardless of the case, after a shift operation, the size of  decreases by one whereas the size of  increases by one.
Since that elements in the deques are sorted with respect to their working sets sizes, a shift operation maintains the Working set invariant.

Search
If no tree is found, the search is unsuccessful.
The running time of this search is  if the search was successful, or  otherwise.

Insert
Inserting an element  into the structure is performed by inserting  into  and enqueuing it into .

Delete
The working set invariant is preserved as deleting an element does not change the order of  the working set of the elements.

Discussion
Splay trees are self adjusting search trees introduced by Sleator and Tarjan in 1985. Using restructuring heuristic, splay trees are able to achieve insert and delete operations in  amortized time, without storing any balance information at the nodes. Moreover, the Working Set Theorem for splay trees states that the cost to access an element in a splay tree is  amortized. 
Iacono's workings set structure obtains the same running time for search, insert and delete in the worst-case. Therefore, offering an alternative to splay trees.

References

Trees (data structures)